Adolf Ahrens (17 September 1879 – 21 January 1957) was a German politician of the German Party (DP) and former member of the German Bundestag.

Life 
Ahrens was a member of the first German Bundestag (MdB) from 1949 to 1953. He was elected via the national list of the German Party (DP) in Bremen.

Literature

References

1879 births
1957 deaths
Members of the Bundestag for Bremen
Members of the Bundestag 1949–1953
German Party (1947) politicians
Members of the Bundestag for the German Party (1947)